is a Japanese politician of the Democratic Party for the People, and a member of the House of Councillors in the Diet (national legislature).

Overview 

A native of Ōita, Ōita, he attended University of Tsukuba and received a Ph.D in medicine from it. He was elected for the first time in 2004.

References

External links 
 

Members of the House of Councillors (Japan)
Living people
1957 births
People from Ōita (city)
Democratic Party of Japan politicians
University of Tsukuba alumni
21st-century Japanese politicians